Márcio de Oliveira Barros (born February 7, 1981 in Rio de Janeiro - died April 21, 2012 in São Paulo) was a Brazilian footballer who played for Atlético Sorocaba and Taubaté.

Career
Marcinho began playing professional football with Botafogo Futebol Clube. Marcinho joined Jiangsu Sainty in 2008. He helped the club promote to the top flight, but he was released at the end of the season and returned to Brazil.

On 24 February 2010, Anhui Jiufang, who would play in China League One, confirmed that Márcio had signed a contract with the club.

Marcio died on April 21, 2012, in São Paulo.

Honours
Jiangsu Sainty
China League One: 2008

References 

1981 births
2012 deaths
Brazilian footballers
Brazilian expatriate footballers
São Paulo FC players
América Futebol Clube (SP) players
Clube Atlético Juventus players
América Futebol Clube (MG) players
Santa Cruz Futebol Clube players
Clube Náutico Capibaribe players
Clube Atlético Sorocaba players
Expatriate footballers in China
China League One players
Jiangsu F.C. players
Anhui Jiufang players
Brazilian expatriate sportspeople in China
Botafogo Futebol Clube (PB) players
Association football forwards
Footballers from Rio de Janeiro (city)